Ilham Sabir (born February 1961) is a Chinese politician of Uyghur origin who has been vice chairman of the Xinjiang Regional Committee of the Chinese People's Political Consultative Conference since 25 January 2018. He previously served as mayor of Ürümqi, the capital of Xinjiang, from 2014 to 2018.

Biography
Ilham Sabir was born in Tacheng Prefecture, Xinjiang, in February 1961. After resuming the college entrance examination, in 1978, he enrolled in Xinjiang Eight-One Agriculture College (now Xinjiang Agricultural University), majoring in agricultural mechanization, where he graduated in 1983. He also studied at Dalian University of Technology and Central Party School of the Chinese Communist Party as a part-time student.

From 1983 to 1992, he worked at Xinjiang Academy of Agricultural Sciences. He was eventually promoted to its deputy director of Development Center and deputy general manager of Science and Technology Development Corporation.

Ilham Sabir joined the Chinese Communist Party in November 1990, and got involved in politics in October 1992, when he was appointed deputy director of Business Division of Department of Agriculture and Industry of CPC Xinjiang Regional Committee. In September 1995, he became deputy director of Agricultural Machinery Bureau of Xinjiang Uyghur Autonomous Region, rising to director in April 2000. He was deputy party secretary of Bortala Mongol Autonomous Prefecture in August 2005, and held that office until December 2008, when he was made deputy director and party branch secretary of the Water Resources Department of Xinjiang Uyghur Autonomous Region. In March 2013, he was named acting mayor of Ürümqi, a major city and the capital of Xinjiang. He was installed as mayor in January 2014. On 25 January 2018, he took office as vice chairman of the Xinjiang Regional Committee of the Chinese People's Political Consultative Conference, Xinjiang's top political advisory body.

References

1961 births
Living people
People from Tacheng Prefecture
Uyghur politicians
Xinjiang Agricultural University alumni
Dalian University of Technology alumni
Central Party School of the Chinese Communist Party alumni
Mayors of Ürümqi
People's Republic of China politicians from Xinjiang
Chinese Communist Party politicians from Xinjiang